Jiří Šisler (born 24 November 1984) is a former professional Czech football player, who played in the Czech First League for clubs including Most, Kladno and Bohemians 1905. He played on loan at Bohemians Prague during the first part of the 2007–08 Czech 2. Liga, leading the team with nine league goals.

References

External links
 
 

1984 births
Living people
Czech footballers
Czech First League players
FK Bohemians Prague (Střížkov) players
FK Baník Most players
SK Kladno players
Bohemians 1905 players
FC Vysočina Jihlava players
FK Čáslav players

Association football midfielders
FC Oberlausitz Neugersdorf players
FSV Budissa Bautzen players
Expatriate footballers in Germany
Czech National Football League players